
On 12 March 1994, the first 32 women were ordained as Church of England priests. The service was officiated by Bishop Barry Rogerson at Bristol Cathedral.

Rogerson ordained the women in alphabetical order, so Angela Berners-Wilson was the very first woman to be ordained.

The youngest woman to be ordained was Karen MacKinnon at age 30, with Jean Kings being the second youngest. The oldest was 69.

In 2004 the tenth anniversary of the ordinations was celebrated at Bristol Cathedral and, by then, one of the priests had died and 14 had retired.

The 32 women ordained on the day were (list copied from the order of service):

 Angela Berners-Wilson, a university chaplain
 Waveney Bishop
 Christine Clarke
 Judith Creighton
 Faith Cully
 Brenda Dowie
 Carol Edwards, of St Christopher's, Brislington
 Annis Fessey
 Jan Fortune-Wood
 Susan Giles
 Jane Hayward
 Jean Kings, part-time parish deacon who was also chaplain at University of the West of England
 Karen MacKinnon, full-time parish deacon
 Audrey Maddock
 Charmion Mann
 Helen Marshall
 Glenys Mills, Christ's Church, Clifton
 Jillianne Norman
 Clare Pipe-Wolferstan
 June Plummer
 Susan Restall, St Mary's, Yate
 Susan Rose
 Susan Shipp
 Margery Simpson
 Sylvia Stevens
 Judith Thompson
 Anita Thorne
 Sheila Tyler
 Pauline Wall
 Rosemary Dawn Watling, at the time a 61-year-old Anglican nun and deacon in a vicarage in Bristol
 Valerie Woods, Vicar of Wood End in Coventry
 Ailsa Newby

In 1994 a plaque was installed in Bristol Cathedral to mark these first 32 women ordained as priests in the Church of England. In 2022 it was replaced with a new plaque that listed the names of the women rather than only the names of the men who carried out the ceremony. Both plaques were carved in Welsh slate. The plaque is located on the north side of the nave where it meets the transept. The women contributed to the cost of the original plaque. The new one, carved by Robyn Golden-Hann, was unveiled by the Bishop of Bristol, Vivienne Faull.

The officiating bishop believed it would take 10 years before the first woman would be ordained as a bishop. In fact, it took 21 years until Libby Lane became the first female bishop in the Church of England as Bishop of Stockport (a suffragan see in the Diocese of Chester) in January 2015 (announced on 17 December 2014). Lane had also been ordained as a priest in 1994.
The first woman to be appointed diocesan bishop was the Right Reverend Rachel Treweek, Bishop of Gloucester, appointed on 26 March 2015.

See also 

 Ordination of women in the Anglican Communion

References

Further reading 
 
 
 
 A suitable job for a woman, BBC

External links 
 "In Historic Service, Church of England Ordains 32 Women to the Priesthood", Episcopal News Service

Women priests
Women Anglican clergy
Women ordained as Church of England priests
First 32 women ordained as Church of England priests
Women ordained as Church of England priests
Women ordained as Church of England priests
Bristol Cathedral